"Unraveling" is the official first single off album Cold Day Memory by American rock band Sevendust. On February 5, 2010, the song made its debut on Sirius XM's Octane station. "Unraveling" is the highest charting single of the band's career to date.

The song was released via iTunes on March 2, 2010.

Music video
The video for the song premiered April 20, 2010 on MTV2 and MTV2.com. Directed by Rafa Alcantara, the video showcases live performances combined with footage from the DVD.

Charts
"Unraveling" is their highest-charting song to date, peaking at number seven on the Billboard Mainstream Rock Songs chart, surpassing "Enemy" and "Driven", which both peaked at number ten.

References

Sevendust songs
2010 singles
Songs written by Dave Bassett (songwriter)
2010 songs
Songs written by Clint Lowery
Asylum Records singles
Song recordings produced by Johnny K